Aries Susanti Rahayu (born 21 March 1995) is a sport climbing athlete from Indonesia. She is mainly active in speed climbing competitions. She has been nicknamed "Spiderwoman". She was the world record holder for women in speed climbing, which she achieved by clocking a time of 6.995 seconds at the 2019 IFSC Xiamen World Cup. Also, this made her the first woman to climb a speed wall in less than seven seconds.

Biography 
As a child, she used to climb trees at home and parks. In 2007, she was introduced to sport climbing by her teacher when she was still a junior high school student.

In 2017, she competed in the Climbing World Cup for the first time, and got her first medal (silver) at the World Cup in Xiamen. In the 2017 Asian Championships in Tehran, she was third in speed.

In 2018, she got her first gold medal at the Climbing World Cup in Chongqing. Then, she got one bronze in Tai'an and two more gold medals at the World Cups in Wujiang and Xiamen, all in China. At the end of the 2018 season, she was second in the overall ranking in the speed discipline. In the same year, at the Asian Championships in Kurayoshi, she was third after she false started in the semifinal.

In 2019, she became the women's world record holder in speed climbing, which she achieved by clocking a time of 6.995 seconds at the 2019 IFSC Xiamen World Cup. As well, this made her the first woman to climb a speed wall in less than seven seconds.

Also in 2019, she was on the Forbes Asia's 30 Under 30 list.

Aries is a Muslim and wears hijab while she competes.

Awards and nominations

Achievements

Asian Games 
Women's speed

Women's speed relay

Asian Championships 
Women's speed

Women's speed relay

IFSC Climbing World Cup 
The IFSC Climbing World Cup is a series of climbing competitions held annually and organized by the International Federation of Sport Climbing (IFSC). The athletes compete in three disciplines: lead, bouldering and speed. The number of competitions and venues vary from year to year. The first World Cup was held in 1989, and included only lead climbing events. Speed climbing was introduced in 1998 and bouldering in 1999.

Women's speed

World records

Rankings

Climbing World Cup

Asian Championships

Number of medals in the Climbing World Cup

Speed

References

External links 

  FPTI Profile

1995 births
Living people
People from Grobogan Regency
Indonesian Muslims
Female climbers
Indonesian rock climbers
Sport climbers at the 2018 Asian Games
Asian Games gold medalists for Indonesia
Asian Games medalists in sport climbing
Medalists at the 2018 Asian Games
IFSC Climbing World Cup overall medalists
Speed climbers